Chen Liyi (born 27 April 1989 in Tianjin) is a female Chinese volleyball player.

Career
She won the 2010 Montreux Volley Masters with her national team, being awarded Best Server.

Clubs
  Tianjin Bridgestone

Individual awards
 2010 Montreux Volley Masters "Best Server"
 2014 Asian Club Championship "Best Outside Spiker"

References

External links
 

1989 births
Living people
Chinese women's volleyball players
Volleyball players from Tianjin
Asian Games medalists in volleyball
Volleyball players at the 2010 Asian Games
Asian Games gold medalists for China
Medalists at the 2010 Asian Games
Wing spikers
21st-century Chinese women